Hypsopygia graafialis is a species of snout moth in the genus Hypsopygia. It was described by Pieter Cornelius Tobias Snellen in 1875. It is found in Colombia.

References

Moths described in 1975
Pyralini